1st Arizona Volunteer Infantry was an infantry regiment in federal service from Arizona Territory that served under special provisions during the Apache wars in 1865–1866. The regiment was primarily raised among the native and indigenous population of Arizona, Mexicans, Maricopas, and Pima. It was thwarted by the US Army, and disbanded when the federal government refused to continue funding.

Formation
After the end American Civil War, the last troops of the California Column returned to California. Due to the ongoing Apache Wars, the need for a local fighting force still existed. The territorial legislature discussed the feasibility of creating a corps of territorial rangers, but the project died because its cost were approximated to be ten time as large as the annual tax revenue of the Territory. Already in 1864, governor John Noble Goodwin had been authorized to raise a regiment of volunteer infantry for three years or for the duration of the war. No troops had, however, been raised during the war. Approval for raising this regiment after the end of the war was given by the War Department in the Spring of 1865 because of the Indian menace, and about 350 men were recruited and mustered into federal service between Sept. 2 and Nov. 3, 1865.

Organization
Colonel William H. Garvin was appointed adjutant general and the immediate superior of the regimental organization. The regiment would primarily be raised among the native and indigenous population of Arizona, Mexicans, Maricopas, and Pima, and be organized into six companies. Company D was, however, never organized.

Operations
The regiment never fought as a unit, but operated as one- or two-company detachments. The basic tactics were search and destroy operations under severe conditions; the United States Army denied the Arizona Volunteers proper quarters, even tents, and the footgear and uniforms were often deficient due to hard service. The indigenous soldiers were very efficient in fighting their traditional enemies, the Apaches. In spite of the demanding service only 20 men deserted. Ten had been killed in action, five died of diseases, and 13 were seriously wounded but survived.

Disbandment
The regiment had been enlisted according to the war provisions of the Federal Government, but when Governor Richard Cunningham McCormick in 1866 wrote to the Secretary of war, Edwin Stanton, asking for a prolongation of the enlistment period of the Arizona Volunteers, Stanton denied the request as there were no law authorizing it. Attempts to include appropriation for its equipment, subsistence and payment failed. The regiment was officially disbanded on July 1, 1866. The actual discharge of the men took, however, much longer time; the last soldiers were discharged Nov. 7, 1866.

References

Citations

Cited literature
 Farish, Thomas Edwin (1916). History of Arizona. Vol. IV. Phoenix, Arizona.
 Johnson, John L. & Kroger, Charles E. (2002) . Arizona Army National Guard: The First One Hundred Years. 180th Field Artillery Regiment Association. Pamphlet Number 870-5.
 Thrapp, Dan L. (1967). The Conquest of Apacheria. University of Oklahoma Press.
 Underhill, Lonnie E. (1997). A history of the First Arizona Volunteer Infantry, 1865–1866. Master's thesis. The University of Arizona.

Apache Wars
Military units and formations established in 1865
Military units and formations disestablished in 1866
Military units and formations of the United States in the Indian Wars
Mexican-American history
Native American military personnel
Arizona Territory
History of Arizona
Military units and formations in Arizona
Military history of Arizona